American Veterans (AMVETS) is a non-partisan, volunteer-led organization formed by World War II veterans of the United States military. It advocates for its members as well as for causes that its members deem helpful to the nation at large. The group holds a Federal charter under Title 36 of the United States Code. It is a 501(c)19 organization.

History
Harold Russell, the handless World War II veteran and Academy Award winner for The Best Years of Our Lives, served three terms as National Commander in the 1950s. As head of AMVETS, Russell wrote to President Harry S. Truman in 1951 supporting his decision to dismiss General Douglas MacArthur during the Korean War.

Russell's telegram to Truman cited MacArthur's "repeated insubordination in violation of basic American principles governing civil versus military authority." His telegram said those were "obvious grounds" to relieve MacArthur. Erle Cocke Jr., commander of the American Legion, said that he was "shocked by the news" that AMVETS and the American Veterans Committee supported MacArthur's firing.

Awards

AMVETS presents its annual Silver Helmet Awards to "recognize excellence and achievement in Americanism, defense, rehabilitation, congressional service and other fields."

See also 

Veterans Day

References

External links

 Official Website
 
 

Charities based in Maryland
American veterans' organizations
1944 establishments in the United States
Organizations established in 1944
Lobbying organizations in the United States
Magazine publishing companies of the United States
Nonpartisan organizations in the United States
Patriotic and national organizations chartered by the United States Congress